John Christopher Casey JP (born 30 June 1964) is an Australian journalist and sports broadcaster. With a media career spanning three decades he is a versatile and respected host and play-by-play commentator who was the first person ever seen live on Australian pay television when it commenced in 1995.

Early life and education 
John was born in the mining town of Broken Hill, New South Wales. He was educated at Burke Ward Primary School and Broken Hill High School, earning the vice-presidency of the Student Representative Council at the latter institution.
While a student he led the school band, was an athletics champion and helped NSW win a national schoolboys Australian football title in the 1979 Shell Cup

Career as a journalist
John started writing for the Barrier Daily Truth newspaper as an 18-year-old in 1981 and upon completion of his cadetship moved to Melbourne and joined The Sun News-Pictorial where, as a general news reporter, he wrote numerous front-page stories. In 1985 John joined The News in Adelaide as a sports journalist and combined this role with duties for the Sunday Mail where he was chief racing sub-editor.

Electronic media
After seven years service with newspapers in three states, John then began his television career as an on-camera sports presenter with SAS-10 (later to become SAS-7). As well as reading the weekend sports news, he also honed his skills as a commentator on national tennis telecasts and hosted the National Basketball League coverage.

During this time he also presented sports breaks for radio stations 5KA and 5AA.

In 1990–91 John became the first ever sports journalist contracted to Channel 7's London bureau and covered events such as Wimbledon tennis, British Open golf at St Andrews, FA Cup Finals, Prix de l'Arc de Triomphe at Longchamp, Formula One and Susie Maroney's epic English Channel swim.

On his return to Australia in 1992, John moved to Sydney and took up a position as senior reporter with Channel 7's national prime time sports program "Seasons" while also reading news on 11AM and the weekend sports breaks for ATN-7. During this time his on the road assignments included the 1993 World Cup soccer qualifier in Argentina and the 1994 Commonwealth Games in Canada.

Pay television
Having gathered experience with Sky Television and British Satellite Broadcasting in London John was recruited to help launch pay television in Australia (Galaxy), which debuted in 1995 with the Premier Sports Network. Television legend Ron Casey (no relation) was to have been the first person seen live on Australian pay-TV, but a technical breakdown prevented this and it was left to John to utter the first words live to camera

Fox Sports
As the longest serving on-air personality at Fox Sports Australia, John has commentated on a wide range of events from AFL, NRL, world record swims from Ian Thorpe and Susie O'Neill, world title fights involving Kostya Tszyu and Anthony Mundine, PGA golf tour, Wimbledon and US Open tennis as well as national titles in athletics and hockey. However, he is best known for his work on National Basketball League telecasts which he has hosted since 1995, leading the play-by-play commentary in almost 1000 NBL and WNBL games combined.

John also called basketball at the 2000 Sydney Olympic Games, including Australia's quarter-final win over Italy. Basketball was one of three sports John called at the Olympics, along with football and boxing.

Studio shows he has hosted for Fox Sports include Main Game and The Back Page.

John also commentated the National League Indoor Cricket tournament in 2002 and 2003, which was played at Knox Indoor Sports in Victoria.

Print media
John worked briefly for the Sunraysia Daily in Mildura, Victoria in 2010, before returning to his hometown of Broken Hill to take on the role of general manager and Managing Editor of the Barrier Daily Truth.

Favorite phrase
'Bangiddy bang bang bang”

Other 
 1983 appointed by His Excellency the Governor as a Justice of the Peace for the State of New South Wales.
 1989 part of the team led by Stewart Ginn which won the South Australian Open pro-am golf title.
 1991 elected councillor for Albert Park Ward of Woodville City Council, South Australia.
 1992 Named "Best Sportscaster" in the Better Hearing Australia Clear Speech Awards. He was also named by Cleo magazine as one of the 50 most eligible bachelors in Australia.

References

External links 
 Starting 5 – Fox Sports

1964 births
Basketball announcers
People from Broken Hill, New South Wales
Living people
Olympic Games broadcasters
Australian tennis commentators
Golf writers and broadcasters
Boxing commentators
Australian sports journalists